Elizabeth "Beth" Santos Leal de Carvalho (May 5, 1946 – April 30, 2019) was a Brazilian samba singer, guitarist, cavaquinist and composer.

Biography

Carvalho was raised in a middle-class family in Rio de Janeiro's South Zone. Her father, João Francisco Leal de Carvalho, was a lawyer. She grew up influenced by different types of music. Her father used to take her to samba school rehearsals, and her mother was a lover of classical music who encouraged her to become a ballerina. She started playing the guitar as a teenager, and got involved with the emerging Bossa Nova movement, winning a nationwide song contest on TV at the age of 19.

Following a 1967 album, "Muito Na Onda," with the project 'Conjunto 3D,' Carvalho did her first solo record, 1968's "Andança", and carried the song of the same name to victory in a larger festival, which brought her to prominence. Although she started her career with Bossa Nova, that was an ephemeral phase which lasted less than one year. Beth started dedicating herself entirely to samba just as her fame began, working with legendary composers such as Nelson Sargento.

Carvalho is a very important artist in the history of samba, as she celebrated and brought the spotlight to the work of legendary composers such as Cartola, Nelson Cavaquinho & Guilherme de Brito when they weren't receiving the attention they deserved. Almost all of her records have songs by these composers, among other legendary sambistas such as Nelson Sargento and the Old Guard of Portela. Her samba school was Mangueira, but that didn't stop her from recording dozens of songs from composers of Portela, the other great traditional samba school in Rio.

Later, in the late 1970s and early 80s, Beth helped bring to the public the work of other rising pagode artists from Cacique de Ramos, such as Almir Guineto, Jorge Aragão and the Fundo de Quintal group. Then, in 1983, she introduced Zeca Pagodinho who would become the major samba name of the 90s. Carvalho always tried to bring underrated composers the recognition they deserve, and she is regarded as madrinha do samba (the godmother of samba). She was a driving force in the modernization of samba in the 80s, and at the same time rejected commercial pop trends in samba arrangements, preserving tradition.

In the 1990s, Beth's popularity wasn't the strongest, but she was always popular. She recorded an album dedicated to the samba from São Paulo, rejecting the famous axiom that "São Paulo is the grave of samba". In 1998 she recorded an album dedicated entirely to the pagode classics, Pérolas do Pagode (Pagode Pearls).

In the new millennium, Beth worked more than ever, releasing CDs and DVDs. With a career that spanned 40 years, she was a historical figure in Brazilian culture, and recognized as the female sambista with the most substantial opus in Brazil, without diminishing other, younger stars such as Clara Nunes and Daniela Mercury.

Trivia
 Beth was a known supporter of both the Botafogo and Clube Atlético Mineiro football teams
 Beth was one of the main personalities of the samba school Mangueira
 Beth had a variety of hits in the 1970s, with her 1979 song "Coisinha Do Pai" being one of her biggest hits. The song was inserted into the Mars Pathfinder.
 Her social music often concerned the poor and the Indigenous peoples in Brazil

Discography
 Beth Carvalho – 40 anos de Carreira – Ao Vivo no Theatro Municipal – Vol.1 (CD) – Andança/Sony – BMG – 2006
 Beth Carvalho – 40 anos de Carreira – Ao Vivo no Theatro Municipal – Vol.2 (CD) – Andança/Sony – BMG – 2006
 Beth Carvalho – 40 anos de Carreira – Ao Vivo no Theatro Municipal (DVD) – Andança/Sony – BMG – 2006
 Beth Carvalho – A Madrinha do Samba – Ao Vivo (DVD) – Indie – 2004
 Beth Carvalho – A Madrinha do Samba – Ao Vivo (CD) – Indie – 2004
 Beth Carvalho Canta Cartola – BMG – 2003
 Nome Sagrado – Beth Carvalho Canta Nelson Cavaquinho – Jam Music – 2001
 Pagode de Mesa Ao Vivo 2 – Universal Music – 2000
 Pagode de Mesa Ao Vivo – Universal Music – 1999
 Pérolas do Pagode – Globo / Polydor – 1998
 Brasileira da Gema – Polygram – 1996
 Beth Carvalho Canta o Samba de São Paulo – Velas – 1993
 Pérolas – 25 Anos de Samba – Som Livre – 1992
 Ao Vivo no Olympia – Som Livre – 1991
 Intérprete – Polygram – 1991
 Saudades da Guanabara – Polygram – 1989
 Alma do Brasil – Polygram – 1988
 Beth Carvalho Ao Vivo (Montreux) – RCA – 1987
 Beth – RCA – 1986
 Das Bençãos Que Virão Com os Novos Amanhãs – RCA – 1985
 Coração Feliz – RCA – 1984
 Suor no Rosto – RCA – 1983
 Traço de União – RCA – 1982
 Na fonte – RCA – 1981
 Sentimento Brasileiro – RCA – 1980
 Beth Carvalho no Pagode – RCA – 1979
 De Pé No Chão – RCA – 1978
 Nos Botequins da Vida – RCA – 1977
 Mundo Melhor – RCA – 1976
 Pandeiro e Viola – Tapecar – 1975
 Pra Seu Governo – Tapecar – 1974
 Canto Por Um Novo Dia – Tapecar – 1973
 Andança – Odeon – 1969

References

External links
Entrevista 1988 (In Portuguese)

1946 births
2019 deaths
Democratic Labour Party (Brazil) politicians
Samba musicians
Latin Grammy Award winners
Latin Grammy Lifetime Achievement Award winners
20th-century Brazilian women singers
20th-century Brazilian singers
21st-century Brazilian women singers
21st-century Brazilian singers
Women in Latin music